Donn Sléibhe Ó Gadhra, King of Sliabh Lugha, died 1217. 

The Annals of the Four Masters record Donn Sléibhe demise in some detail, sub anno 1227:

 Donslevy O'Gara, Lord of Sliabh Lugha, was slain by Gillaroe, his own brother's son, after the latter had, on the same night, forcibly taken a house from him and Gillaroe himself was afterwards put to death for this crime by the devise of Hugh O'Conor.

External links

 http://www.ucc.ie/celt/published/T100010A/index.html

Monarchs from County Mayo
13th-century Irish monarchs